Ahmad Aba District, also known as Ahmadabad District, is a district in Paktia Province, Afghanistan. It is located to the east of Gardez, the provincial capital of Paktia. Ahmad Aba District was created in 2005 within Said Karam District.

History
On 16 May 2020, in an overnight attack on a security checkpoint in Ahmad Aba District, the Taliban killed eight Afghan soldiers and wounded nine others. The soldiers had been providing security for a multi-purpose dam.

External links 
Tom Coghlan. "Can tribes take on the Taleban?", BBC News (26 December 2007).
Paktika Executive Summary (PDF) at Naval Postgraduate School

References

Districts of Paktia Province